Nathan Anthony Catucci (born 10 August 1983), commonly known as Nathan Catucci, is an American film director who is known for directing the award-winning feature film Impossible Monsters that was released in 2020.

Catucci's other projects in development are The Beltlands and Rabbit.

Early life and education
Catucci was born on 10 August 1983 in Rochester, New York. He holds a Bachelor of Fine Arts (BFA) in film and TV from New York University Tisch School of the Arts, where he graduated with honors in 2006.

Career
Catucci wrote, directed and produced his debut feature film, Impossible Monsters. The movie starred Tony Award-winner Santino Fontana, Natalie Knepp, Devika Bhise, Donall O Healai, Chris Henry Coffey, Geoffrey Owens, Dennis Boutsikaris, and Laila Robins.

The film premiered at the 2019 Cinequest Film & Creativity Festival. The film subsequently screened at the New York Latino Film Festival presented by HBO, won Best Feature Narrative at the Arizona Underground Film Festival and received an honorable mention at the New Jersey Film Festival. The film had its UK premiere at Cine-Excess on November 7, 2019.

On February 14, 2020, the picture premiered in New York and Los Angeles theaters and Gravitas Ventures distributed it globally on March 3, 2020. For the production, Catucci received the Panavision New Filmmaker Grant.

Filmography

Awards and recognition
 2016: Panavision New Filmmaker Grant Recipient for Impossible Monsters
 2019: Winner, Best Narrative Feature, Arizona Underground Film Festival for Impossible Monsters
 2019: Honorable Mention, Best Feature Film, New Jersey International Film Festival for Impossible Monsters

Personal life
Catucci currently lives in New York City on the Upper West Side of Manhattan with his wife, Meghan Catucci.

References

1983 births
Living people
American film directors
People from Rochester, New York
Tisch School of the Arts alumni